was a town located in Funai District, Kyoto Prefecture, Japan.

As of 2003, the town had an estimated population of 8,516 and a density of 114.94 persons per km2. The total area was 74.09 km2.

On October 11, 2005, Tanba, along with the towns of Mizuho and Wachi (all from Funai District), was merged to create the town of Kyōtamba.

External links
 Official website of Kyotamba 

Dissolved municipalities of Kyoto Prefecture
Kyōtamba, Kyoto